The 2013 FIM Moto3 World Championship was a part of the 65th F.I.M. Road Racing World Championship season. The riders' championship title was won by Team Calvo rider Maverick Vinales and runner up by Alex Rins from Estrella Galicia 0,0.

Season summary
In Moto3, the championship was dominated by three Spanish riders, all riding KTM machinery. Like the premier class, there was a final race title decider between Ajo Motorsport's Luis Salom, Estrella Galicia 0,0's Álex Rins and Maverick Viñales of Team Calvo; if any rider of the three won the race, they finished as the champion, regardless of the other results. After Salom crashed out early in the race, Rins and Viñales battled at the front, with Viñales ultimately coming out as the victor and champion, with Rins being passed for second place on the line by Jonas Folger. With Salom only making it back up to fourteenth, Rins finished as runner-up ahead of Salom. With every race won by a KTM rider – seven wins for Salom, six for Rins, three for Viñales and one for Álex Márquez, the teammate of Rins, at Motegi – the marque was comfortably the winners of the constructors' championship, scoring more than double the points of the next placed constructor, Kalex KTM.

Calendar
The following Grands Prix were scheduled to take place in 2013:

The Fédération Internationale de Motocyclisme released a 18-race provisional calendar on 19 September 2012. On 23 November 2012, the calendar was updated following confirmation that the return of the Argentine Grand Prix would be postponed to 2014. The Grand Prix of the Americas held at the Circuit of the Americas in Austin, United States, replaced the Portuguese Grand Prix, which had been run at Estoril since 2000. The United States hosted two races, the other being the Indianapolis Grand Prix at the Indianapolis Motor Speedway.

 ‡ = Night race
 †† = Saturday race

Calendar changes
 The Grand Prix of the Americas was added to the calendar.
 The Portuguese Grand Prix was taken off the calendar. The race was scheduled on the calendar since 2000.
 The British Grand Prix was moved back, from 17 June to 1 September.
 The Japanese Grand Prix was moved back, from 14 to 27 October.

Teams and riders
 A provisional entry list was released by the Fédération Internationale de Motocyclisme on 28 November 2012. An updated entry list was released on 12 February 2013. All teams used Dunlop tyres.

Notes:
  — Livio Loi competed from the Spanish Grand Prix onwards, after reaching the age of 16 on 27 April which is the minimum age to compete in the championship.

Rider changes 

 Having originally signed a deal for 2013, Maverick Viñales decided to quit the Avintia Blusens team before the end of the 2012 season.
 Danny Webb moved from Mahindra Racing to World Wide Communication, which was known as Ambrogio Next Racing in 2012.
 Miguel Oliveira moved from Estrella Galicia to Mahindra Racing.

Results and standings

Grands Prix

Riders' standings
Scoring system
Points were awarded to the top fifteen finishers. A rider had to finish the race to earn points.

Constructors' standings
Points were awarded to the top fifteen finishers. A rider had to finish the race to earn points.

 Each constructor got the same number of points as their best placed rider in each race.

References

Moto3
Grand Prix motorcycle racing seasons